William Joseph Newing (1 August 1892 – 7 March 1970) was an Australian rules footballer who played with University in the Victorian Football League (VFL) in 1913.

Family
The son of John Newing, and Mary Jane Newing (1859-1926), née Kernan, William Joseph Newing was born at Moonee Ponds, Victoria on 1 August 1892.

He married Olivia Marguerite Byrne on 20 November 1922.

Education
Educated at the Christian Brothers College, in East St Kilda, he began his medical studies at the University of Melbourne in 1912, graduating Bachelor of Medicine and Bachelor of Surgery (MBBS), in absentia, on 20 December 1916.

Football
He played five games for the First XVIII of the Melbourne University Football Club in the VFL competition in 1913. His first match was against Fitzroy on 26 April 1913. and the last, against St Kilda on 5 July 1913. He was awarded a "half blue" for football.

Cricket
He played District Cricket with Essendon Cricket Club (four matches, 1912–13 season) and with the University of Melbourne Cricket Club (six matches, 1914–15 to 1916–17 seasons).

Military service
He enlisted in the First AIF on 26 November 1917, and served overseas (in France) as a Medical Officer in the Australian Army Medical Corps. He left Australia aboard HMAT  (A32) on 28 January 1918, and returned to Australia aboard HMAT Anchises (A68), arriving in Melbourne on 22 September 1919.

Medicine
Upon graduation, he began his career as a Resident Medical Officer at the Melbourne Hospital; and, following his military service, he worked at St Vincent's Hospital, Melbourne:
Newing was educated at the Christian Brothers College, East St Kilda…. In 1918 he enlisted in the Australian Army Medical Corps and served as a captain in France. At St Vincent’s Hospital in Melbourne, where he worked for over forty years, he was remembered as a tall, military looking, distinguished figure. Some seven or eight years older than his contemporaries, due to war service interrupting his career, Newing’s demonstrations of clinical findings impressed his students. His specialty was chest diseases, especially pulmonary tuberculosis from which he suffered as a result of his war experiences. (Carolan, 2015, pp.131-132.)

University Council
For a number of years he was a member of the University Council of the University of Melbourne, representing "Medicine and Surgery".

Victorian Tuberculosis Association
He served as the President of the Victorian Division of the Australian Tuberculosis Association.

Death
He died at his home in Kew, Victoria on 7 March 1970.

Footnotes

References
 Holmesby, Russell & Main, Jim (2007). The Encyclopedia of AFL Footballers. 7th ed. Melbourne: Bas Publishing.
 World War One Nominal Roll: Captain William Joseph Newing, Collection of the Australian War Memorial.
 World War One Embarkation Roll: Captain William Joseph Newing, Collection of the Australian War Memorial.
 World War One Service Record: Captain William Joseph Newing (VX117209), National Archives of Australia.
 Troops Returning: On S.S. Anchises: Left England Aug.22: On Duty, The Argus, (Monday, 22 September 1919), p.10.
 Carolan, J.M., The Foundation and Early History of Catholic Church Insurances (CCI) 1900-1936, Ph.D. Dissertation, School of Theology, Faculty of Theology and Philosophy, Australian Catholic University, Strathfield, New South Wales, November 2015.
 New Graduates of the Melbourne University, (Melbourne) Punch, Thursday, 26 April 1917), p.20.

External links
 
 

1892 births
1970 deaths
University Football Club players
Australian rules footballers from Melbourne
Melbourne Medical School alumni
Australian Army officers
People from Moonee Ponds, Victoria
Military personnel from Melbourne